Wina is a commune in Mayo-Danay Department, Cameroon. In 2005, the population was recorded at 30702.

References 

Populated places in Far North Region (Cameroon)
Communes of Cameroon